Massachusetts Avenue station is a station on the Orange Line of the San Diego Trolley in Lemon Grove, California, a suburb of San Diego. The station serves as a commuter center and park and ride lot for the surrounding residential community.

History
Massachusetts Avenue opened as part of the second segment of the Euclid Line on May 12, 1989.

This station was renovated from October 17, 2011 through fall 2012 as part of the Trolley Renewal Project, although the station remained open during construction.

Station layout
There are two tracks, each served by a side platform.

See also
 List of San Diego Trolley stations

References

San Diego Trolley stations
Railway stations in the United States opened in 1989
1989 establishments in California
Orange Line (San Diego Trolley)